Spend Spend Spend is a musical with a book and lyrics by Steve Brown and Justin Greene and music by Brown. The musical is inspired by the life of Viv Nicholson.

Productions
Spend Spend Spend premiered in 1998 at the West Yorkshire Playhouse and won the Barclays Theatre Award for Best Musical of the Year. The production starred Rosie Ashe and Nigel Richards. After a week of previews, the West End production, directed by Jeremy Sams and choreographed by Craig Revel Horwood, opened on 12 October 1999 at the Piccadilly Theatre, where it ran until 5 August 2000. The original cast included Barbara Dickson, Steven Houghton, Jeff Shankley and Rachel Leskovac. The original London production was arranged by the Musical Director, Dane Preece. Shortly after closing in London, the production, with most of the original cast, went on a UK Tour. The Musical Director for the tour was Steve Hill and the role of Keith was played by Grant Anthony.

On 8 July 2009 the Watermill Theatre, Newbury, presented a revival of the musical, directed by Craig Revel Horwood, with Karen Mann as the older Viv, Kirsty Hoiles as young Viv and Greg Barnett as Keith. The production next had a 7-week tour across the country, beginning 28 September 2010 to 9 November 2010. It was awarded the 2010 TMA award for Best Musical and Kirsty Hoiles (young Viv) was awarded the TMA award for Best Supporting Actress in a Musical.

Premise
In 1961, Yorkshire housewife Viv Nicholson wins £152,319 in the football pools. When a reporter asks her what she plans to do with her new fortune, she replies, "I'm going to spend, spend, spend!," which is exactly what she does. Her rags-to-riches-to-rags-again story takes her through five husbands, expensive sports cars, fur coats and jewelry, a battle with alcohol, and bankruptcy as, unable to cope with her new-found wealth and fame, she rapidly spirals downward.

Awards and nominations
Olivier Award
Laurence Olivier Award for Best Musical (nominee)
Laurence Olivier Award for Best Actress in a Musical (Dickson, winner)
Laurence Olivier Award for Best Actress in a Musical (Leskovac, nominee)
Laurence Olivier Award for Best Supporting Performance In A Musical (Houghton, nominee)
Laurence Olivier Award for Best Director (nominee)
Laurence Olivier Award for Best Choreography (nominee)
Laurence Olivier Award for Best Set Design (nominee)
Laurence Olivier Award for Best Lighting Designer (Mark Henderson, winner for multiple productions)
Evening Standard Award for Best Musical, 1999 (winner)
Critics Circle Award for Best Musical (winner)

References

External links
 Webpage for film director/producer John Goldschmidt
 Watermill Theatre production information

1998 musicals
Biographical musicals
British musicals
Laurence Olivier Award-winning musicals
Plays set in the 20th century
Plays set in England
West End musicals